Mettupalayam railway station is a train station located in Mettupalayam, a suburb of Coimbatore district in Tamil Nadu, India. Its railway code is MTP. It is one of the important railway stations located in the Coimbatore District, because the Nilgiri Mountain Railway to the hill station of Ooty starts from here. It is the connection between the narrow-gauge Nilgiri Mountain Railway and the broad-gauge main network of Indian Railways.

The station is served by the Salem Division of Southern Railway zone of Indian Railways.  inauguration of the service, from 15 October 1929, the two through carriages operating between Mangalore and Peshawar (Which was located in India Afghanistan Border then) were restricted to run between Mettupalayam instead of Mangalore as it was more financial viable. The British officer working in northern India could come for resting in Neelagiris using this train. Tea Garden Express ran in metre gauge between Udhagamandalam and Mettupalayam and broad gauge between Mettupalayam and Cochin Harbour Terminus.  Post Indian independence, the Ooty–Mettupalayam trip was cut off and the train ran as No.565/566 between Cochin Harbour Terminus and Mettupalayam, since the 1970s. #Old Cochin_Mettupalayam Ooty Link of Cochin_Madras Link oo both Direction Train Number 561 573 TimeTable, Nilgiri Express termed as Blue Mountain use to cover Madras to Mettupalayam & acts as link to MG Blue Mountain Express for Ooty with through Coach attached to Podanur Calicut Mail. Madras Ooty Through Timings were:- Madras 21.00; Ooty 10.20 & in return:- Ooty 16.30; Madras 05.50. It still exist past NMR UNESCO World Heritage Tag in 1994 with Ooty Mettupalayam Passenger acts as connecting train. Nilgiri Express use to be main portion of Bangalore Mail, Island Express, Malabar Express & Bombay-Coimbatore (Through Coach bifurcate/amalgamate to Madras-Bombay Mail).

The Mettupalayam Ooty Mountain train (06136) only departs from Mettupalayam after the arrival of Blue Mountain Express(12671) at Mettupalayam

See also
 
 Nilgiri Mountain Railway

Gallery

References

Railway stations in Coimbatore district
Mountain railways in India